Borj-e Khankaram (also Romanized as Borj-e Khānkaram) is a village in Qotbabad Rural District, Kordian District, Jahrom County, Fars Province, Iran. At the 2006 census, its population was 67, in 14 families.

References 

Populated places in Jahrom County